Ali Shah Durrani also known as Ali Shah Abdali, was ruler of the Durrani Empire from 1818 to 1819. He was the son of Timur Shah Durrani, an Afghan from the Pashtun ethnic group. and the penultimate Durrani Emperor. He was strangled by his brother Shah Isma'il in 1818 or 1819.

References

19th-century Afghan monarchs
Emirs of Afghanistan
Ali Shah
Year of death unknown
Year of birth unknown
Pashtun people
19th-century Afghan politicians
19th-century monarchs in Asia